Polyommatus antidolus is a butterfly in the family Lycaenidae. It was described by Hans Rebel in 1901. It is found in Turkey.

Subspecies
Polyommatus antidolus antidolus (Kurdistan)
Polyommatus antidolus pertekensis (Carbonell, 2003) (Turkey)

References

Butterflies described in 1901
Polyommatus
Butterflies of Asia
Butterflies of Europe